Lampea is a genus of ctenophores belonging to the family Lampeidae.

The genus has almost cosmopolitan distribution.

Species:

Lampea elongata 
Lampea fusiformis 
Lampea komai 
Lampea lactea 
Lampea pancerina

References

Tentaculata